Pachymerium caucasicum is a species of centipede in Geophilidae family. It was described by Carl Attems in 1903 and is endemic to the European part of Turkey. Males of this species have 47 pairs of legs; females have 49 pairs of legs. Some authorities deem P. caucasicum to be a junior synonym of P. ferrugineum.

References

Geophilomorpha
Animals described in 1903
Endemic fauna of Turkey
Myriapods of Europe